George Richard Herron (1888–1967) was a New Zealand politician of the National Party.

Biography

Herron was born in Pukerau in 1888. He worked as a blacksmith for five years, before farming for 33 years. He was associated with the Farmers Union, the breeding of Ayrshire cows and the Southland A & P Association.

He represented the Southland electorate of Awarua from 1944 until his retirement in 1957. Herron replaced James Hargest, who had been killed in World War II.

Herron died in 1967.

Notes

References

1888 births
1967 deaths
New Zealand National Party MPs
Members of the New Zealand House of Representatives
New Zealand MPs for South Island electorates